Sergei Khoroshun (born June 27, 1980) is a Russian professional ice hockey goaltender playing for Epinal Hockey Club of the FFHG Division 1.

Khoroshun previously played in the Kontinental Hockey League for HC Neftekhimik Nizhnekamsk and Vityaz Chekov. He also played one game for Dinamo-Energija Yekaterinburg in the Russian Superleague. He also played in the Tipsport Liga for HC '05 Banská Bystrica and the Ligue Magnus for Aigles de Nice.

References

External links

1980 births
Living people
Les Aigles de Nice players
Avtomobilist Yekaterinburg players
HC '05 Banská Bystrica players
HC Berkut players
Dauphins d'Épinal players
Dizel Penza players
Kristall Saratov players
Krylya Sovetov Moscow players
HC Neftekhimik Nizhnekamsk players
Rubin Tyumen players
Russian ice hockey goaltenders
Sportspeople from Yekaterinburg
Torpedo Nizhny Novgorod players
THK Tver players
HC Vityaz players
Russian expatriate ice hockey people
Russian expatriate sportspeople in Ukraine
Russian expatriate sportspeople in Slovakia
Russian expatriate sportspeople in France
Expatriate ice hockey players in Ukraine
Expatriate ice hockey players in France
Expatriate ice hockey players in Slovakia